Marjanabad may refer to:

Marjanabad, Ardabil
Marjanabad, Tehran
Marjanabad, West Azerbaijan